World Class Capital Group (World Class) is a privately owned investment firm that focuses on global real estate. The firm is based in Austin, Texas, with additional offices located in Dallas and New York City. World Class primarily invests in real estate equity, debt, and securities. Investments are made across the US and are made in various asset classes - including retail, office, industrial, self-storage and multifamily. World Class Mortgage Capital originates senior mortgages, mezzanine loans and preferred equity on a fixed-rate and floating-rate basis.

The company is owned by President & CEO Nate Paul. Paul was listed in the 2016 edition of Forbes’ 30 under 30 in Finance for having built a $1 billion real estate portfolio across the United States by the age of 28. World Class currently owns more than 120 properties totaling over 10 million square feet across 16 states nationwide.

History
In January 2011, World Class Capital Group purchased Teakwood Plaza shopping center in Austin, Texas. In October of the same year, the company acquired three Austin properties which previously held Spaghetti Warehouse, Katz’s Deli, and La Zona Rosa, a live music venue.

World Class purchased a prime lakefront property in downtown Austin in August 2012. The same month, the company acquired a 12-property self-storage portfolio from Sovran Self Storage. The properties in Dallas and the Houston area operate under the Great Value Storage flag, a wholly owned and operated subsidiary of World Class. World Class acquired a portfolio of eight self storage facilities in Ohio in November 2012, which also operate under Great Value Storage. Also in 2012, the company purchased shopping centers in Austin, Texas and Denver, Colorado.

In 2013, World Class purchased Nellis Self Storage facility in Las Vegas, and a five-property self-storage portfolio in Houston, Texas and Indianapolis, and re-branded under the Great Value Storage flag. Later that month, it acquired the retail center Huron Plaza in Denver, Colorado. In March 2013, World Class purchased a prime 1.3-acre property surrounding the Austonian skyscraper in the heart of downtown Austin. That same month, it acquired Galleria Oaks, a shopping center in Austin. The company purchased two commercial properties in June 2013 including North Oaks shopping center in Houston, Texas, and Andrita Media Center in Los Angeles. World Class bought a student housing complex, State Flats, in San Marcos, Texas in December of that year. In the same month, it purchased Culebra Crossing, a retail center in San Antonio, Texas.

The company purchased the former Cypress Semiconductor campus in Round Rock, Texas in February 2014. That same month, it acquired six self-storage properties in Houston and brought them under Great Value Storage. In March 2014, World Class Capital acquired the KPMG Center in Dallas, Texas. In September 2014, World Class Capital acquired a prime site in uptown Dallas. The company expanded into Louisiana when it bought Manhattan Place in Harvey, Louisiana from Weingarten Realty Investors. A portfolio of eight Midwestern shopping centers was acquired in November 2014. The purchase from Kimco Realty, a New York-based real estate investment trust, included shopping centers in Illinois, Iowa, Missouri, and Oklahoma. With this investment, the company increased its holdings to 15 states. Paul was previously embroiled in a wage theft scandal from 2014, where he was accused of stealing over $500,000 in tips from bar staff at Rio. Around that time, while renovating the former iconic Katz’s Deli, a steel support beam was severed causing the floor of the upstairs music venue to buckle. The owners of that venue were in talks with Paul to stay until the end of their 10-year lease option. Unable to pay for outside contractors to fix the damage, they settled out of court and vacated the premises early. In early 2016, investor Michael Macs sued Nate Paul and World Class Capital accusing Paul of fraud, breach of contract and misrepresentation in connection with investments of nearly $15 million in several real estate ventures.

In 2015, World Class purchased a three-property self-storage portfolio in Jackson, Mississippi and rebranded the properties to Great Value Storage, World Class’ storage management platform.  The acquisition was made to expand the World Class footprint in the Southeast.

In 2016, World Class was named the #24 top commercial property owner in America. In August 2019 its offices were raided by the FBI.

World Class acquired a retail center in Austin, Texas in June 2016. The acquisition was made to replace the retail center with a self-storage facility under the Great Value Storage name.

In September 2016, World Class was listed as the 16th largest self-storage operator in the country. A few months later, World Class purchased 13 office buildings in Austin, Texas. The buildings had a total of 546,984 square feet and were purchased from Westmount Realty Capital.

In late 2016, World Class expanded the firm’s debt strategy by hiring five former high-level Credit Suisse real estate bankers, marking a strategic expansion of the World Class real estate investment business. At least two of those bankers left within six months of joining the firm.

In 2016-7, several acquisitions have been made to expand World Class’ storage portfolio under the Great Value storage name. 

In July 2018, Nate Paul and his company acquired several properties in downtown Austin containing various live music venues and locked out the tenants despite current leases, effectively stealing all of these business’ equipment.

On August 14 2019, both World Class Holdings' offices in Austin, Texas and Nate Paul's personal residence in Westlake, Texas were raided by the FBI.

References

External links
 Official website

Companies based in Austin, Texas
Financial services companies established in 2007
Real estate companies of the United States
2007 establishments in Texas